"Sunglasses at Night" is a song by Canadian singer Corey Hart. It was released on January 21, 1984 as the first single from his debut album, 1983's First Offense, and became a hit single in the United States, officially rising to number 7 on the Billboard Hot 100 during the week that ended on September 1, 1984. The song combines an unflagging synthesizer hook, characteristic arpeggio, rock guitar and cryptic lyrics. AllMusic has since described it as "an instant classic with its distinctive melody and catchy chorus".

According to co-producer Phil Chapman, the recording sessions for the album took place in a studio whose air conditioning/heating vents were directly above the mixing console. Air from the vents blew directly into the faces of the control room personnel, so they often wore sunglasses to protect their eyes. Hart, working on a new song, began to improvise lyrics that included the line "I wear my sunglasses at night."

Composition 
The song is performed in the key of B minor in common time with a tempo of 127 beats per minute. Hart's vocals span from F3 to A4. The song’s synthesizer riff uses a descending upper-leading tone sequence through the chords Bbm, Gdim, Gb, and Bbm (the Gb resolving to the F in this chord).

Music video
The music video, directed by Rob Quartly, shot at the Don Jail in Toronto, reflects the vision of a "fashion" police state, with scenes of Hart in a prison cell, without sunglasses, being strong-armed by police officers and paraded past various citizens wearing their regulation shades.  Near the end of the video, Hart is taken to the office of a female police officer (who releases Hart in the song's end), played by Laurie Brown, who later became the host of The NewMusic as well as a VJ on MuchMusic. This video uses the shorter single version instead of the longer album version.

Charts

Weekly charts

Year-end charts

References

1984 singles
Corey Hart (singer) songs
1983 songs
EMI America Records singles
Aquarius Records (Canada) singles
Juno Award for Video of the Year videos
Songs written by Corey Hart (singer)